Zero Point Zero Production, Inc. is a television, film, print, and digital content company founded in 2003 by Executive Producers Chris Collins and Lydia Tenaglia. Since its inception, the company has produced hundreds of hours of documentary content in over 100 countries around the world, including the critically acclaimed, Emmy and Peabody Award-winning series Anthony Bourdain: Parts Unknown, the Emmy Award-winning The Mind of a Chef, and Emmy nominated The Hunt with John Walsh. As of 2019, ZPZ has received 27 Emmy Awards with 80 Nominations, A Peabody Award, 2 PGA Awards, 5 ACE Eddie Awards, and 5 James Beard Awards. The company also publishes Food Republic.

Television

Film

Awards and nominations 

 2007 CINE Golden Eagle Award Winner, Best Lifestyle Series (Gourmet's Diary of a Foodie)
 2007 BANFF Award Winner, Best Lifestyle Series (Gourmet's Diary of a Foodie)
 2008 James Beard Award Winner, Best Food Television Series (Gourmet's Diary of a Foodie)
 2008 CINE Golden Eagle Award Winner, Best Lifestyle Series (Gourmet's Diary of a Foodie)
 2008 Silver Medal at New York Festivals Television Broadcasting Awards, Best Editing [Documentary/Info] (Gourmet's Diary of a Foodie)
 2009 Silver Telly Award Winner, Editing and Cinematography (Gourmet's Adventures with Ruth)
 2009 Daytime Emmy Winner, Outstanding Single Camera Editing (Gourmet's Diary of a Foodie)
 2009 Emmy Winner, Outstanding Cinematography for Nonfiction Programming (Anthony Bourdain: No Reservations: Laos)
 2009 Silver Medal at New York Festivals International TV Programming & Promotion Awards, Travel & Tourism (Gourmet's Diary of a Foodie)
 2011 Northern Lights Award Winner, Broadcast Award (The Layover)
 2011 Emmy Winner, Outstanding Cinematography for Nonfiction Programming (Anthony Bourdain: No Reservations: Haiti)
 2011 CLIO Award Winner (Anthony Bourdain: No Reservations)
 2011 ACE Eddie Award Winner, Best Edited Reality Series (Anthony Bourdain: No Reservations)
 2012 Critics' Choice Award, Best Reality Series (Anthony Bourdain: No Reservations)
 2013 James Beard Award Winner, Television Program, On Location ("The Mind of a Chef") 
 2013 Emmy Winner, Outstanding Cinematography for Nonfiction Programming ("Anthony Bourdain: Parts Unknown: Myanmar")
 2013 Emmy Winner, Outstanding Informational Series or Special ("Anthony Bourdain: Parts Unknown)
 2014 Daytime Emmy Winner, Outstanding Culinary Program ("The Mind of a Chef")
 2014 Emmy Winner, Outstanding Informational Series or Special ("Anthony Bourdain: Parts Unknown")
 2015 Daytime Emmy Winner, Outstanding Main Title and Graphic Design ("The Mind of a Chef")
 2015 Daytime Emmy Winner, Outstanding Single Camera Photography ("The Mind of a Chef")
 2015 Daytime Emmy Winner, Outstanding Single Camera Editing ("The Mind of a Chef")
 2015 Emmy Winner, Outstanding Informational Series or Special ("Anthony Bourdain: Parts Unknown")
 2016 Daytime Emmy Winner, Outstanding Main Title and Graphic Design ("The Mind of a Chef")
 2016 Daytime Emmy Winner, Outstanding Directing in a Lifestyle/Culinary/Travel Program ("The Mind of a Chef")
 2016 Daytime Emmy Winner, Outstanding Cinematography ("The Mind of a Chef")
 2016 Daytime Emmy Winner, Outstanding Individual in Animation - production designer ("The Mind of a Chef")
 2016 Daytime Emmy Winner, Outstanding Culinary Host - Gabrielle Hamilton and David Kinch ("The Mind of a Chef")
 2016 Emmy Winner, Outstanding Informational Series or Special ("Anthony Bourdain: Parts Unknown")
 2017 Daytime Emmy Winner, Outstanding Main Title and Graphic Design ("The Mind of a Chef")
 2017 Daytime Emmy Winner, Outstanding Sound Mixing - Live Action ("The Mind of a Chef")

References

Television production companies of the United States
Mass media companies established in 2003
2003 establishments in New York (state)